Cecil Bertram Vernon St John (28 July 1879 – 19 September 1932) was an Australian tennis player.

St. John won the doubles title alongside Pat O'Hara Wood at the Australasian Championships, the future Australian Open, in 1923, and reached three more finals at the tournament, losing in singles to Pat O'Hara Wood in 1923, in doubles alongside Gordon Lowe in 1915, and in mixed doubles alongside Margaret Molesworth in 1923.

He is the only player to have reached a major tournament final, in singles or doubles, with only one hand.

Grand Slam finals

Singles (1 runner-up)

Doubles (1 title, 1 runner-up)

Mixed doubles (1 runner-up)

References

Australasian Championships (tennis) champions
Australian male tennis players
1932 deaths
1879 births
Grand Slam (tennis) champions in men's doubles
Tennis people from Queensland